Feux is a commune in the Cher department in the Centre-Val de Loire region of France.

Geography
The river Vauvise and its tributary, the Chantereine, form the eastern border of the commune.

Population

Sights
 The church of St. Anne, dating from the nineteenth century.
 The fifteenth-century presbytery.
 A feudal motte at the Champ de l'Etang.
 Vestiges of a medieval castle, now incorporated in a farm, at Marnay.

See also
Communes of the Cher department

References

External links

Website about Feux 

Communes of Cher (department)